Leslie Gordon Bell (December 4, 1889 – September 8, 1963) was a Canadian politician and lawyer. He was elected to the House of Commons of Canada in 1925 as a Member of the Conservative Party to represent the riding of St. Antoine. He was re-elected in 1926 and 1930.

References
 

1889 births
1963 deaths
Conservative Party of Canada (1867–1942) MPs
Members of the House of Commons of Canada from Quebec